Colonization: Down to Earth is an alternate history and science fiction novel by Harry Turtledove. It is the second novel of the Colonization series, as well as the sixth installment in the extended Worldwar series. British editions are entitled Colonisation: Down to Earth and are the second of the Colonisation series.

Plot
After the nuclear attack on the colonist ships in Second Contact, the Race continues to try to find the nation responsible, along with the purpose of the Lewis and Clark, a large space station launched by the United States. At the same time, the range of animals brought by the Race's colonists begins to spread into human nations, causing ecological trouble and causing conflicts between them.

In Nazi Germany, Heinrich Himmler, the Führer, dies unexpectedly in late 1964 and is replaced by Ernst Kaltenbrunner. Kaltenbrunner, angered by the policy of accommodation Himmler carried out towards the Race, including his refusal to invade the Race-occupied buffer state of Poland, initiates a nuclear war between Germany and the Race in 1965.

References

2000 American novels
Novels set during the Cold War
Worldwar and Colonization series
American alternate history novels
Alien invasions in novels
Del Rey books
Cultural depictions of Heinrich Himmler
Fiction set in 1964
Fiction set in 1965